The Homi Bhabha Cancer Hospital and Research Centre is a 300-bed oncology hospital in Mohali, Punjab. It was built by the Tata Memorial Centre.

History 
The Punjab government granted 50 acres of land for construction of the hospital. The foundation stone for the hospital was laid in 2013 by Prime Minister Manmohan Singh. It was inaugurated on 24 August 2022 by Prime Minister Narendra Modi.

References 

Hospitals in Punjab, India